A list of films produced in the United Kingdom in 1980 (see 1980 in film):

1980

See also
1980 in British music
1980 in British radio
1980 in British television
1980 in the United Kingdom

References

External links

1980
Films
Lists of 1980 films by country or language